was a Japanese video game developer and publisher founded in 1983. The company produced games for a number of platforms, including home consoles, portable consoles, and personal computers. Human declared bankruptcy in 2000 and disbanded. Its former members went on to form new companies including Nude Maker, Sandlot, Spike, and Grasshopper Manufacture.

The company is known for originating the popular Fire Pro Wrestling series, as well as other sports games such as Formation Soccer and Final Match Tennis, and racing video games such as Human Grand Prix and Fastest 1. They are also known for developing the first music rhythm video game, Dance Aerobics (1987), the 3D open world game Mizzurna Falls (1998), and some early horror games including the Twilight Syndrome and Clock Tower series.

History
On November 1, 1999, Human Corporation began to negotiate restructure with Tokyo Hachiōji district court over the approximately 4 billion yen outstanding debt. As part of the deal, the game creator school subsidiary was to be transferred. At the same time, the rights of Fire Pro Wrestling series, Twilight Syndrome series, Bakusou Dekotora series went to Spike Co., Ltd.

In January 2000, Human Corporation was declared bankrupt for failing to negotiate for a restructuring deal over the 3.79 billion yen (as of November 1999) outstanding debt.

Former Human members went on to form different development teams including Nude Maker, Sandlot, and Spike, and notable member Goichi Suda formed his own company, Grasshopper Manufacture, with former members.

Games

Developed by Human Entertainment

Arcade 
 Front Row (unreleased)
 Mad Dancing (unreleased)
 Grand Striker - Human Cup (released 1993)
 Blazing Tornado (released 1994)
 Grand Striker 2 (released 1996)

Famicom Disk System 

 The Mysterious Murasame Castle (released 1986)

Game Boy 
 HAL Wrestling (released 1990)
 SD Gundam Gaiden: Lacroan Heroes (released on October 6, 1990)
 Super Soccer   (released 1991-1992)

Nintendo Entertainment System 
 Adventures of Gilligan's Island
 Athletic World
 Dance Aerobics
 Egypt
 Exciting Rally: World Rally Championship
 Gyrodine
 Kabuki: Quantum Fighter
 Kamen Rider Black
 Karakuri Kengoden Musashi Lord: Karakuri Jin Hashiru!
 Meimon! Daisan Yakyuubu
 Monster Party
 Motocross Champion
 Venus Wars
 Stadium Events
 SD Gundam World Gachapon Senshi 2 - Capsule Senki
 Super Team Games
 Top Rider

Nintendo 64 
 Air Boarder 64 (released March 27, 1998)
 F1 Pole Position 64 (released October 15, 1997)

PC Engine 
 F1 Triple Battle  (released 1989)
 Fire Pro Wrestling Combination Tag (released June 22, 1989)
 Fire Pro Wrestling 2nd Bout (released August 30, 1991)
 Fire Pro Wrestling 3: Legend Bout (released 1992)
 Fire Pro Women-ALL WOMEN VS JWP (released 1995)
 Final Match Tennis (released 1991)
 Formation Soccer-Human Cup 90 (released 1990)
 FORMATION SOCCER ON J LEAGUE (released 1994)
 FORMATION SOCCER '95 DELLA SERIE A (released 1995)
 Human Sports Festival (released 1992)
 NEO METAL FANTASY (released 1992)
Space Battleship Yamato “Cinemalize Simulation Game” (released December 1992)

 Vasteel (released 1990)
 Vasteel 2 (released 1994)

PC (Windows) 
 Clock Tower ~The First Fear~ (released March 28, 1997)
 The Conveni: Ano Machi wo Dokusen Seyo (released April 26, 1996)
 The Conveni III: Ano Machi wo Dokusen Seyo (released April 19, 2002)
The Conveni III: Ano Machi wo Dokusen Seyo - Popular Edition (released June 24, 2004)
The Conveni Pack: Ano Machi wo Dokusen Seyo + Power Up Kit (released April 24, 2003)
 The Marugoto (released December 7, 2001)

PlayStation 
 Bakuso Dekotora Densetsu: Art Truck Battle (released June 24, 1998)
 Clock Tower ~The First Fear~ (released July 17, 1997)
 Clock Tower (released December 13, 1996 as Clock Tower 2)
 Clock Tower II: The Struggle Within (released March 12, 1998 as Clock Tower: Ghost Head)
 The Conveni: Ano Machi o Dokusen Seyo (released March 28, 1997)
 The Conveni 2: Zenkoku Chain Tenkai da! (released December 18, 1997)
 The Conveni Special (released March 12, 1998)
 Fire Pro Wrestling G (released 2000)
 Formation Soccer '97: The Road to France (released June 27, 1997)
 Formation Soccer '98: Ganbare Nippon in France (released June 4, 1998)
 Hyper Final Match Tennis (released March 22, 1996)
 Hyper Formation Soccer (released October 13, 1995)
 Mikagura Shōjo Tanteidan (released September 17, 1998)
 Mizzurna Falls (released December 23, 1998)
 Moonlight Syndrome (released October 9, 1997)
 Neko Zamurai (released March 4, 1999)
 Remote Control Dandy (released July 22, 1999)
 Twilight Syndrome: Search (released March 1, 1996)
 Twilight Syndrome: Investigation (released July 19, 1996)
 The Firemen 2: Pete & Danny (released December 22, 1995)
 Vanguard Bandits (released July 30, 1998)
 Zoku Mikagura Shōjo Tanteidan ~Kanketsuhen~ (released October 7, 1999)

Sega Saturn 
 The Conveni: Ano Machi wo Dokusen Seyo (released March 20, 1997)
 The Conveni 2: Zenkoku Chain Tenkai da! (released March 12, 1998)
 Fire Pro Wrestling S: 6 Men Scramble (released December 27, 1996)

Sega CD 
 Bari-Arm (Android Assault)

Sega Mega Drive (Genesis) 
 Fastest 1
 Thunder Pro Wrestling Retsuden
 Ultraman (released 1993)

Super NES (Super Famicom) 
 Clock Tower (released September 14, 1995)
 Dragon's Earth (released December 30, 1992)
 Dream Basketball: Dunk & Hoop
 F1 Pole Position
 F1 Pole Position 2
 Human Grand Prix III: F1 Triple Battle
 Human Grand Prix IV: F1 Dream Battle
 SOS (also known as Septentrion) (released June 1, 1994)
 Super Final Match Tennis (released August 12, 1994)
 Super Fire Pro Wrestling X (released December 22, 1995)
 Super Fire Pro Wrestling X Premium (released March 29, 1996)
 Super Fire Pro Wrestling: Queen's Special
 Super Soccer
 Super Formation Soccer II
 Super Formation Soccer 94
 Super Formation Soccer 95: della Serie A
 Super Formation Soccer 96: World Club Edition
 Taekwon-Do (released June 28, 1994)
 The Firemen (released September 9, 1994)
 Waku Waku Ski Wonder Spur

TurboGrafx-16/Duo/PC Engine 
 Far The Earth no Jakoutei: Neo Metal Fantasy (released 1992)
 Final Match Tennis (released March 17, 1991)
 Formation Soccer: Human Cup '90 (released April 27, 1990)
 Formation Soccer on J-League (released January 15, 1994)
 Formation Soccer 95: della Serie A (released April 7, 1995)
Vasteel (released 1992)

WonderSwan 
 Clock Tower (released December 9, 1999)

Published by Human Entertainment

Arcade 
 Mad Dancing (released 1992)
 Grand Striker - Human Cup (released 1993)
 Blazing Tornado (released 1994)
 Grand Striker 2 (released 1996)

Dreamcast 
Fire Pro Wrestling D (released March 6, 2001)

Game Boy 
 Chacha-Maru Boukenki 3: Abyss no Tou (released August 2, 1991)
 Chacha-Maru Panic (released April 19, 1991)
 HAL Wrestling (released 1990)

Nintendo 64 
 Air Boarder 64 (released March 27, 1998)
 Human Grand Prix: The New Generation

TurboGrafx-16/Duo/PC Engine 
 Fire Pro Wrestling Combination Tag (released June 22, 1989)
 Final Match Tennis (released March 17, 1991)
 Fire Pro Wrestling 2nd Bout (released August 30, 1991)
 Vasteel (released 1992)
 Far The Earth no Jakoutei: Neo Metal Fantasy (released 1992)
 Laplace no Ma (March 30, 1993)
 Vasteel 2 (released 1994)

PC (Windows) 
 Clock Tower ~The First Fear~ (released March 28, 1997)
 The Marugoto (released December 7, 2001)

PlayStation 
 Bakusou Dekotora Densetsu: Art Truck Battle (released June 24, 1998)
 Blue Breaker: Ken yori mo Hohoemi o (released 1997)
 Clock Tower ~The First Fear~ (released July 17, 1997)
 Clock Tower (released December 13, 1996 as Clock Tower 2)
 Clock Tower II: The Struggle Within (released March 12, 1998 as Clock Tower: Ghost Head)
 Fire Pro Wrestling G (released 2000)
 Formation Soccer '97: The Road to France
 Hyper Final Match Tennis (released March 22, 1996)
 Mikagura Shōjo Tanteidan (released September 17, 1998)
 Mizzurna Falls (released December 23, 1998)
 Moonlight Syndrome (released October 9, 1997)
 Neko Zamurai (released March 4, 1999)
 Remote Control Dandy (released July 22, 1999)
 Septentrion: Out of the Blue (released   March 11, 1999)
 Sound Qube (released March 12, 1998)
 The Conveni: Ano Machi wo Dokusen Seyo (released March 28, 1997)
 The Conveni 2: Zenkoku Chain Tenkai da! (released December 18, 1997)
 The Conveni Special (released March 12, 1998)
 Twilight Syndrome: Search (released March 1, 1996)
 Twilight Syndrome: Investigation (released July 19, 1996)
 Vanguard Bandits (released July 30, 1998)
 Zoku Mikagura Shōjo Tanteidan ~Kanketsuhen~ (released October 7, 1999)

Saturn 
 2TaxGold (released January 17, 1997)
 Fire Pro Gaiden: Blazing Tornado (released 1995)
 Fire Pro Wrestling S: 6 Men Scramble (released December 27, 1996)
 The Conveni: Ano Machi wo Dokusen Seyo (released February 20, 1997)
 The Conveni 2: Zenkoku Chain Tenkai da! (released March 12, 1998)

Super NES 
 Clock Tower (released September 14, 1995)
 Dragon's Earth (released December 30, 1992)
 Dream Basketball: Dunk & Hoop
 F1 Pole Position
 Human Baseball
 Super Fire Pro Wrestling 3 Final Bout
 The Firemen (released September 9, 1994)
 Laplace no Ma (released 1993)
 Super Final Match Tennis (released August 12, 1994)
 Super Fire Pro Wrestling X (released December 22, 1995)
 Super Fire Pro Wrestling X Premium (released March 29, 1996)
 SOS (released May 28, 1993)
 Tadaima Yuusha Boshuuchuu Okawari (released November 25, 1994)
 Taekwon-Do (released June 28, 1994)

WonderSwan 
 Bakusou Dekotora Densetsu (released December 22, 1999)
 Clock Tower (released December 9, 1999)

References

External links 
  via Internet Archive
Human Entertainment at MobyGames

Japanese companies established in 1983
Companies that have filed for bankruptcy in Japan
Defunct video game companies of Japan
 
Video game companies disestablished in 2000
Video game companies established in 1983
Video game development companies
Video game publishers
Japanese companies disestablished in 2000